Bolma millegranosa is a species of sea snail, a marine gastropod mollusk in the family Turbinidae, the turban snails.

Distribution
This marine species occurs off Japan.

References

External links
 To World Register of Marine Species

millegranosa
Gastropods described in 1958